Cardiogram (Kazakh: Кардиограмма, "Kardıogramma") is a 1995 Kazakh drama film written and directed by Darezhan Omirbaev.

The film was entered into the main competition at the 52nd edition of the Venice Film Festival, winning the CICT/UNESCO Prize. It was also awarded Silver Screen Award for Best Asian Feature Film at the 1997 Singapore International Film Festival.

Plot

Cast 
 
 Zhasulan Asauov 	as Zhasulan
 Gulnara Dusmatova 	as Enfermera Gula
 Ilyas Kalymbetov 	as Ilyas
 Saule Toktybayeva 	as Saule

References

External links

1995 drama films
1995 films
Films directed by Darezhan Omirbaev
Kazakhstani drama films